George Bodington (1799–1882) was a British general practitioner and pulmonary specialist.

Career
Born in Buckinghamshire and educated at Magdalen College, Oxford, he served a surgical apprenticeship then studied at St Bartholomew's Hospital. In 1825 he was licensed by the Society of Apothecaries, and became a physician and GP in Erdington (then in Warwickshire, now West Midlands).

His great professional interest was pulmonary disease and in 1836 he acquired the asylum and sanitorium at Driffold House, Maney, Sutton Coldfield.

In 1840 he published his essay, On the Treatment and Cure of Pulmonary Consumption, condemning contemporary treatments and advocating instead dry frosty air, gentle exercise, and a healthy diet. This was attacked by reviewers in the Lancet and he became disenheartened with his work.

He later turned to the treatment of insanity. In 1851 the local census recorded eleven "lunatics" and six staff, including the doctor and his family, at Driffold House.

At some point the asylum was moved to the White House, Maney, which was demolished in 1935 to provide a site for an Odeon cinema (now part of the Empire Cinemas group). In 1881 the Doctor was living at Manor Hill where his two daughters ran a girls boarding school. The census of that year shows nine pupils of which five were nieces.

He was also a local politician and served on the Sutton Corporation for forty years (having as usual being appointed for life).

He was the paternal grandfather of barrister Oliver Bodington and the great-grandfather of Nicholas Bodington.

Works

Further reading 
 Jane Davage, The life and times of George Bodington, 
 
 
 British Medical Journal George Bodington's Obituary 11 March 1882
 BMJ 7 June 1902 Obituary of George Fowler Bodington
 Sutton Coldfield News 20.4.1956 reporting Birmingham Civic Society plaque unveiled at 165 Gravelly Hill, Erdington.

References

 footnote 7
 
Warwickshire Asylums from the Rossbret Institutions website

External links 

 Biography by Andrew MacFarlane (2013)

1799 births
1882 deaths
19th-century English medical doctors
Alumni of Magdalen College, Oxford
People from Sutton Coldfield
Alumni of the Medical College of St Bartholomew's Hospital
People from Birmingham, West Midlands
Alumni of the University of Edinburgh